Willy A. Kleinau (1907–1957) was a German actor.

Partial filmography

 Hafenmelodie (1949)
 Second Hand Destiny (1949) - Ebeling
 The Blue Swords (1949) - August der Starke
 The Council of the Gods (1950) - Mr. Lawson
 The Axe of Wandsbek (1951) - SS-Standartenführer Hans Peter Footh
 Story of a Young Couple (1952) - Dr. Ulrich Plisch
 Karriere in Paris (1952) - Vautrin
 Shadow over the Islands (1952) - Bassen Brause
 Die Unbesiegbaren (1953) - Herr Schulz
 Kein Hüsung (1954) - Oll Daniel
 Gefährliche Fracht (1954) - Tetje Köhlermann
 Carola Lamberti – Eine vom Zirkus (1954) - Taxichauffeur
 Der Teufel vom Mühlenberg (1955) - Mühlmann
 Das Fräulein von Scuderi (1955) - René Cardillac
 Ein Polterabend (1955) - Guckkastenmann
 Love, Dance and a Thousand Songs (1955) - Luigi
 The Bath in the Barn (1956) - Müllermeister Klas
 Winter in the Woods (1956) - Verwalter Stengel
 The Czar and the Carpenter (1956) - van Bett, Bürgermeister von Saardam
 Der Hauptmann von Köpenick (1956) - Friedrich Hoprecht
 My Brother Joshua (1956) - Mathias Bruckner
 Was die Schwalbe sang (1956) - Forester Mahnke
 The Night of the Storm (1957) - Friedrich Eichler
 Spielbank-Affäre (1957) - Martinez
 Spring in Berlin (1957) - Grieche aus Los Angeles
 Die Schönste (1957) - Alexander Berndorf
 Reifender Sommer (1959) - Erich Kattner (final film role)

External links
 

1907 births
1957 deaths
German male film actors
People from Mühlhausen
20th-century German male actors